Tymianka may refer to the following places:
Tymianka, Łódź Voivodeship (central Poland)
Tymianka, Masovian Voivodeship (east-central Poland)
Tymianka, Podlaskie Voivodeship (north-east Poland)